"No Brainer" is a song by American musician DJ Khaled featuring Canadian singer Justin Bieber and American rappers Chance the Rapper and Quavo. The song was released on July 27, 2018, by We the Best Music Group and Epic Records, the second single from Khaled's eleventh studio album, Father of Asahd (2019). It marks the second collaboration between the artists, following 2017's "I'm the One" (which also featured Lil Wayne), from Khaled's tenth studio album Grateful. Khaled produced the song with DaviDior, Sir Nolan, Nic Nac and Poo Bear. The song peaked within the top ten of the charts in Australia, New Zealand, Norway, Sweden, Ireland, the United Kingdom, and the United States.

Release and promotion
In early July, DJ Khaled shared plans for his song, inspired by his vacation to Cabo San Lucas. "I'm gonna make my own soap," he said. "So I'm here to announce today—and this is crazy that we're talking about this—I'm gonna make my own soap." He also revealed, "I got a song coming out with Justin Bieber and some more of my great friends on the record. I want it to be a surprise, but it's going to be one of the biggest anthems." In a series of teasers on Instagram, he gradually rolled out the news. In one video, Justin and his manager, Scooter Braun, joined in and showcased their southern accents. "We've always been the best and always will be the best. That's a statement and a half," Bieber teased.

Critical reception
Billboards Sam Tornow described the song as a potential summer hit with its "all-star cast, bubbly beats and infectious chorus". He wrote: "The crew keeps the hype up all the way through, from Bieber's first chorus until his last. Every collaborator holds his own, accenting each other's different styles while still popping off during his own verse." Conversely, Sheldon Pearce of Pitchfork called the song "gratuitous fun that's derivative and shiftless and capitalistic".

Chart performance
In the United States, the song debuted at number five on the US Billboard Hot 100, making it Khaled's fourth top-ten song, Bieber's 14th, Chance the Rapper notches his second and Quavo posts his fifth top ten on the chart. The song dropped to number 11 in its second week on the chart.

In the United Kingdom, "No Brainer" debuted at number one on the Official Trending Chart following its release, with the song set to debut at number 9 of the chart regardless of any added points. In August 2018, the song opened at number four on the UK Singles Chart, where it became DJ Khaled's third and Bieber's 14th top-five single in the country. As for other countries, the song reached the top ten of the charts of Australia, New Zealand, Norway, Sweden and Ireland.

Music video
The music video premiered via YouTube an hour after the song's release. Directed by Colin Tilley, the video begins on the set of a movie in Hollywood with "We The Best" replacing the typical white Hollywood Sign. Bieber helms the director chair alongside Khaled and his son, Asahd. One part of the video is highly reminiscent of a scene from the film Wayne's World, as Khaled and Justin stand atop the faux clouds. Product placement is heavily displayed throughout the blockbuster, boasting different liquors from Bumbu to Ciroc and Belaire. Quavo injects himself into the colorful scene taking on the role of an artist, meticulously painting away at his blank canvas with a parrot mysteriously chilling out on his shoulder. Chance is the last of the co-stars to make an appearance, and the setting immediately switches to a Gatsby-themed party, as the squad dances the night away.

Personnel
Credits adapted from Tidal.

 DJ Khaled – vocals, production
 Justin Bieber – vocals
 Chance the Rapper – vocals
 Quavo – vocals
 DaviDior – production
 Sir Nolan – production
 Benjamin Fekete – production
 Nic Nac – production
 Poo Bear – co-production

 Skrt – mix engineering
 Chris O'Ryan – engineering
 Chris Galland – engineering
 Scott Desmarais – engineering assistance
 Robin Florent – engineering assistance
 Jeff Lane – record engineering
 Josh Gudwin – record engineering
 Juan "Wize" Peña – record engineering
 Brendan Morawaski – record engineering

Charts

Weekly charts

Year-end charts

Certifications

Release history

References

2018 singles
2018 songs
DJ Khaled songs
Justin Bieber songs
Quavo songs
Chance the Rapper songs
Music videos directed by Colin Tilley
Number-one singles in Denmark
Songs written by Chance the Rapper
Songs written by DJ Khaled
Songs written by Justin Bieber
Songs written by Nic Nac
Songs written by Poo Bear
Songs written by Quavo
Songs written by Sir Nolan
Epic Records singles
Song recordings produced by Poo Bear
Song recordings produced by DJ Khaled